Eureka, Indiana may refer to:
Eureka, Lawrence County, Indiana
Eureka, Spencer County, Indiana